The mixed 4 × 100 metre medley relay competition at the 2018 Pan Pacific Swimming Championships took place on August 9 at the Tokyo Tatsumi International Swimming Center.

Records
Prior to this competition, the existing world and Pan Pacific records were as follows:

Results
All times are in minutes and seconds.

Final 
The final was held on 9 August from 18:00.

References

2018 Pan Pacific Swimming Championships
Panpacific